Red-boxing is a tactic used by American political candidates to coordinate with their political action committees (PACs) in a way that circumvents campaign finance laws. Political campaigns place statements or requests on public campaign websites which are then used by PACs to support the candidate. It is used by both major American parties, but most often by Democrats. The name for the practice comes from the red-colored box that often surrounds the instructions for PACs on campaign websites.

Campaigns will use boxes to focus PACs' attention on certain aspects of opposing candidates' biographies, including past controversies. They often include detailed instructions on what type of ad to use, what areas to target, and what age, gender, or ethnicity to appeal to.

Red boxes are most often located in the "Media Resources" or "Media Center" sections of a campaign website where political operatives know to look. Instructions sometimes use terms like "hear" for radio ad requests, "read" for direct mail, "see" for television, and "see while on the go" for digital ads.

Complaints about illegal coordination between political campaigns and PACs involving public material posted online submitted to the Federal Election Commission have not resulted in any action. 

According to Adav Noti, the legal director of campaign finance watchdog group the Campaign Legal Center, "The coordination of super PACs and candidates is the primary mechanism for corruption of federal campaigns in 2022."

A 2022 New York Times survey found that at least 19 Democrats running in four states holding contested congressional primaries on May 16, 2022, had used some kind of red-boxing. Republicans did not rely on red-boxing as much, largely using other tactics to communicate with PACs.

In August 2022, The Philadelphia Inquirer reported that the Philadelphia Board of Ethics was considering an amendment to the city's campaign finance regulations which would explicitly ban red-boxing. Opponents of the amendment argued that its wording was too broad, and would also cover normal campaign messaging.

Possible instances of use

 Clay Aiken, running in the 2022 United States House of Representatives elections in North Carolina.
 Nida Allam, running in the 2022 United States House of Representatives elections in North Carolina. On April 20, a red box on Allam's website requested online advertisements targeting "especially women, Democrats under 50 and progressives" that she would "be an unapologetic progressive." On May 5, the exact words from the red box were used by the Working Families Party in a Facebook ad. According to Facebook records as detailed in The New York Times, "95 percent of the ad’s impressions were with women and people under 54."
 Becca Balint, running in the 2022 United States House of Representatives election in Vermont.
 Patrick Branco, running in the 2022 United States House of Representatives elections in Hawaii.
 Shontel Brown, running in Ohio's 11th congressional district special election in 2021.
 Jessica Cisneros, running in the 2022 United States House of Representatives elections in Texas. The red box on Cisneros website asked for advertising to be directed toward "Liberals, voters under 50 and women—across only San Antonio, Guadalupe and Atascosa counties".
 Henry Cuellar, running in the 2022 United States House of Representatives elections in Texas.
 John Fetterman, running in the 2022 United States Senate election in Pennsylvania. On a website made by Fetterman's campaign, a page acting as a red box making suggestions to super PACs stated "This page only exists because of our broken campaign finance system." The website asked for only positive ads, which a super PAC followed suit with.
 Carrick Flynn, running in the 2022 United States House of Representatives elections in Oregon
 Valerie Foushee, running in the 2022 United States House of Representatives elections in North Carolina. The red box on Foushee's website asked for advertising to be directed toward "Black voters ages 45+ in Durham and white women ages 45+ in Orange".
 Conor Lamb, running in the 2022 United States Senate election in Pennsylvania. A red box on Lamb's website outlined attacks against Fetterman that he would like his super PAC to run. A television ad later ran which claimed Fetterman had been called a "Silver Spoon Socialist" and "Republicans think they could crush" him.
 Jamie McLeod-Skinner, running in the 2022 United States House of Representatives elections in Oregon
 Kurt Schrader, running in the 2022 United States House of Representatives elections in Oregon. On April 29, 2022, a red box on Schrader's website, was published with what The New York Times called a "three-pronged takedown" of Jamie McLeod-Skinner, who he called his "toxic challenger". The box included a link to a two-page, opposition-research document about McLeod-Skinner's time as a city manager. On May 3, a super PAC funded by a pharmaceutical industry dark money group ran television ads using the exact three lines Schrader had published in the red box.
 Jon Tester, running in the 2018 United States Senate election in Montana.
 J. D. Vance, running in the 2022 United States Senate election in Ohio. Vance's super PAC, which is funded with $15 million from Peter Thiel, used an unpublicized Medium page to post a large amount of internal and polling data that members of the Vance campaign consulted.

References

Campaign finance in the United States